Tan Chen Choon is a Malaysian politician who served as Member of the Johor State Executive Council (EXCO) in the Pakatan Harapan (PH) state administration under former Menteri Besar Sahruddin Jamal from April 2019 to the collapse of the PH state administration in February 2020 and Member of the Johor State Legislative Assembly (MLA) for Jementah from May 2013 to March 2022. He is also the husband of former Member of Parliament (MP) for Batu Gajah Fong Po Kuan. He is a member of the Democratic Action Party (DAP), a component party of the Pakatan Harapan (PH) opposition coalition.

Election results

References 

Democratic Action Party (Malaysia) politicians
21st-century Malaysian politicians
Members of the Johor State Legislative Assembly
Johor state executive councillors
1970 births
Living people
People from Johor
Malaysian people of Chinese descent